Dhule City Assembly constituency is one of the five constituencies of the Maharashtra Vidhan Sabha (legislative assembly) located in Dhule district of the state in western India.

This Vidhan Sabha segment is a part of the Dhule Lok Sabha constituency along with five other Vidhan Sabha segments, namely Dhule Rural and Sindkheda in the Dhule district and Malegaon Central, Malegaon Outer and Baglan in the Nashik district.

Members of Legislative Assembly
 1978: Kisanrao Khopade, Indian National Congress (I)
 1980: Kamalabai Ajmera, Indian National Congress (I)
 1985: Shalini Borase, Indian National Congress 1st time 
 1990: Shalini Borase, Indian National Congress 2nd time
 1995: Rajwardhan Kadambande, Independent 1st time 
 1999: Anil Gote, Samajwadi Janata Party (Maharashtra) 1st time 
 2004: Rajwardhan Kadambande, Nationalist Congress Party 2nd time 
 2009: Anil Gote, Loksangram Party 2nd time
 2014: Anil Gote, Bharatiya Janata Party 3rd time
 2019: Shah Faruk Anwar, All India Majlis-e-Ittehadul Muslimeen, 1st  time.

Election results

Assembly Elections 2009

Assembly Elections 2019

See also
 Dhule
 List of constituencies of Maharashtra Vidhan Sabha

References

Assembly constituencies of Maharashtra
Dhule